The Mercedes-Benz EQB (X243) is a seven-seat battery electric compact luxury crossover SUV produced by the German automobile manufacturer Mercedes-Benz from 2021.

Overview

The EQB is part of the EQ family, a range that will expand to include 10 new models by 2022. The Mercedes-Benz EQB is based on the Mercedes-Benz GLB. The EQB is available in both front-wheel drive and 4MATIC branded dual motor all wheel drive configurations. The Mercedes EQB will be available in five and seven seat layouts.

The Mercedes-Benz EQBs for the Chinese market will be manufactured at the Beijing Benz plant in China. Mercedes Benz-EQBs sold outside of China will be manufactured at the Mercedes-Benz Kecskemet plant in Hungary, unlike the non-Chinese market fossil-fuel powered GLBs, which are manufactured at Daimler AG-Nissan joint venture COMPAS plant in Mexico.

The Mercedes-Benz EQB will go on sale in 2021 as a 2022 model year vehicle in China and Europe. Sales of EQB will begin in 2022 as a 2023 model year vehicle in other markets outside of China and Europe.

Models
The specifications include:

References

EQB
Cars introduced in 2021
Compact sport utility vehicles
Luxury crossover sport utility vehicles
Front-wheel-drive vehicles
All-wheel-drive vehicles
Production electric cars
Mercedes-EQ